The Farm Labor Contractor Registration Act (FLCRA) — P.L. 88-582 (September 7, 1964, as amended) — regulated the activities of farm labor contractors, that is, agents who recruit and are otherwise engaged in the transport, housing, and employment of migratory agricultural workers. Under FLCRA, farm labor contractors were required to secure certification through the United States Department of Labor.

Strengthened by amendment in 1974, the Act became a target of growing criticism and, in 1983, was repealed and replaced with the Migrant and Seasonal Agricultural Workers Protection Act (P.L. 97-470).

Amendment to 1963 Act
U.S. Congressional amendment to the Farm Labor Contractor Registration Act of 1963.

References

External links
 
 
 

1964 in law
88th United States Congress
United States Department of Agriculture